Red Mountain Pass elevation  is a mountain pass in the San Juan Mountains of western Colorado
in the United States.

The pass straddles a divide that separates Ouray and San Juan counties. The pass is named for the nearby Red Mountain on the northeast side of the pass.  The name is derived from the iron oxide laden rock that forms their slopes. 

The pass separates the Uncompahgre and Las Animas River watersheds, and also serves as a dividing point between the Uncompahgre and San Juan National Forests. The pass is traversed by the Million Dollar Highway, U.S. Highway 550 between Ouray and Silverton, which is part of the San Juan Skyway Scenic Byway.

The pass is known for being treacherous in the wintertime due to the steep 8% grade and switchbacks on the north side facing Ouray, though the entire road is paved. Avalanches are frequent, and can block the highway for some time. The lower part of the pass towards Ouray is blasted into near-vertical cliffs of quartzite hundreds of feet above Red Mountain Creek and the Uncompahgre River. This section of road is winding, narrow and has no shoulder.

Mining district

The Red Mountain Mining District lies from the divide northward to Ironton Park, halfway down towards Ouray. It was the site of a historic silver boom from 1882 until 1893, including the Yankee Girl and National Belle. Head frames of the old workings are still visible from the highway, as are the remains of the three largest communities: Red Mountain Town, Ironton, and Guston.  The sprawling Idarado Mine (Treasury Tunnel) continued digging until the 1970s, and reclamation of tailings is ongoing.

References

Mountain passes of Colorado
San Juan Mountains (Colorado)
U.S. Route 50
Landforms of Ouray County, Colorado
Landforms of San Juan County, Colorado
Transportation in Ouray County, Colorado
Transportation in San Juan County, Colorado
San Juan National Forest
Uncompahgre National Forest